The 2021–22 Liberty Flames men's basketball team represented Liberty University in the 2021–22 NCAA Division I men's basketball season. The team played its home games in Lynchburg, Virginia at Liberty Arena. The team were led by Ritchie McKay, who was in the seventh season of his current stint as head coach and ninth overall. Liberty competed as a member of the East Division of the ASUN Conference.

Previous season
In a season limited due to the ongoing COVID-19 pandemic, the Flames finished the 2020–21 season 23–6, 11–2 in ASUN play to finish in first place in the ASUN. They defeated Kennesaw State, Stetson, and North Alabama to win the ASUN tournament. As a result, they received the conference's automatic bid to the NCAA tournament as the No. 13 seed in the Midwest region. They lost in the first round to Oklahoma State.

Roster

Schedule and results

|-
!colspan=12 style=|Non-conference regular season

|-
!colspan=9 style=| ASUN Conference regular season

|-
!colspan=12 style=| ASUN tournament
|-

Source

References

Liberty Flames basketball seasons
Liberty
Liberty Flames basketball team
Liberty Flames basketball team